Xəsili (also, Häsili, Khasili, and Khasyly) is a village and municipality in the Barda Rayon of Azerbaijan.  It has a population of 1,337.

References

Populated places in Barda District